Shamkir City Stadium is a multi-purpose stadium in Shamkir, Azerbaijan.  It is currently used mostly for football matches. It serves as a home ground of FK Shamkir. The stadium was reconstructed in 2002 and after reconstruction holds 15,000 spectators.

Football venues in Azerbaijan
Multi-purpose stadiums in Azerbaijan